Šebířov is a municipality and village in Tábor District in the South Bohemian Region of the Czech Republic. It has about 300 inhabitants.

Villages of Křekovice, Křekovická Lhota, Kříženec, Lhýšov, Popovice, Skrýšov, Vosná, Vrcholtovice, Vyšetice and Záříčí u Mladé Vožice are administrative parts of Šebířov.

References

Villages in Tábor District